is a Japanese professional baseball outfielder who is currently a free agent. He has played in Nippon Professional Baseball (NPB) for the Saitama Seibu Lions and Tokyo Yakult Swallows.

On December 2, 2020, he become free agent.

References

External links

 NPB.com

1989 births
Living people
Baseball people from Hokkaido
Japanese baseball players
Nippon Professional Baseball outfielders
Saitama Seibu Lions players
Tokyo Yakult Swallows players